Guioa is a genus of about 78 rainforest tree species known to science, which constitute part of the plant family Sapindaceae. They have a wide distribution, ranging from throughout Malesia, in Burma, Cambodia, Vietnam, Thailand, Malay Peninsula, Borneo, Sumatra, Philippines, Java, Flores, Timor, Sulawesi, Moluccas, New Guinea, further southwards through the east coast of Queensland and New South Wales, Australia and further eastwards to the Pacific Islands, including Tonga, New Caledonia, Fiji and Samoa.

At global, national and regional government scales, many Guioa species have been threatened with extinction, as officially recognised by the International Union for Conservation of Nature (IUCN) and by continental, national and local governments. Twenty five species, or more, have official IUCN global conservation statuses of either "critically endangered", "endangered" or "vulnerable" (to global extinction).

The Australian species are known to the logging industry as cedars, though they have no direct relationship with true cedars or the Australian members of the Meliaceae which are known as cedars.

Selected species
This incomplete listing was sourced from Peter C. van Welzen's 1989 revision of the genus and earlier scientific papers, the Australian Plant Name Index and Australian Plant Census, the Census of Vascular Plants of Papua New Guinea, Flora Malesiana, the Checklist of the vascular indigenous Flora of New Caledonia, Flora Vitiensis (Fiji), and the Flora of Tonga.

 Guioa acuminata  – Philippines, New Guinea  –  Endangered
 Guioa acutifolia , Glossy tamarind  – New Guinea, Moluccas, Qld, Australia
 Guioa amabilis  – Vogelkop Peninsula, New Guinea
 Guioa aryterifolia  – New Guinea
 Guioa asquamosa  – Flores, Timor –  Vulnerable
 Guioa bicolor  – Philippines –  Vulnerable
 Guioa bijuga  – Thailand, Malay Peninsula, Borneo, Sumatra, Philippines
 Guioa capillacea  – Fiji endemic
 Guioa chrysea  – Fiji endemic
 Guioa comesperma  – New Guinea incl. surrounding islands, Qld, Australia
 Guioa contracta  – New Guinea
 Guioa coriacea  – Lord Howe Island endemic
 Guioa crenata  – New Caledonia endemic
 Guioa crenulata  – New Caledonia endemic
 Guioa diplopetala  – Burma, Thailand, Cambodia, Vietnam, Malay Peninsula, Borneo, Sumatra, Sulawesi, Java
 Guioa discolor  – Philippines –  Endangered
 Guioa elliptica  – New Guinea
 Guioa eriantha  – New Guinea
 Guioa fusca  – New Caledonia endemic
 Guioa glauca  – New Caledonia endemic
 var. glauca – New Caledonia endemic
 [[Guioa glauca var. vulgaris|var. vulgaris]]  – New Caledonia endemic
 Guioa gracilis  – New Caledonia endemic
 Guioa grandifoliola  – New Guinea –  Critically endangered
 Guioa hirsuta  – Sulawesi
 Guioa hospita  – New Guinea –  Critically endangered
 Guioa koelreuteriana  – Borneo, Philippines, New Guinea
 Guioa lasioneura  – Qld, Australia
 Guioa lentiscifolia  – Tonga endemic
 Guioa malukuensis  – Moluccas –  Vulnerable
 Guioa megacarpa  – New Guinea
 Guioa melanopoda  – W. New Guinea –  Vulnerable
 Guioa membranifolia  – W. New Guinea, Moluccas
 Guioa microsepala  – New Caledonia endemic
 Guioa misimaensis  – New Guinea
 Guioa molliuscula  – New Guinea –  Vulnerable
 Guioa montana  – Qld, Australia
 Guioa multijuga  – W. New Guinea –  Vulnerable
 Guioa myriadenia  – Philippines –  Endangered
 Guioa normanbiensis  – New Guinea –  Vulnerable
 Guioa novobritannica  – New Guinea –  Vulnerable
 Guioa oligotricha  – New Guinea –  Vulnerable
 Guioa ovalis  – New Caledonia
 Guioa palawanica  – Philippines –  Critically endangered
 Guioa parvifoliola  – Philippines –  Critically endangered
 Guioa patentinervis  – Moluccas –  Vulnerable
 Guioa pauciflora  – New Guinea –  Vulnerable
 Guioa pectinata  – New Caledonia endemic
 Guioa pleuropteris  – Burma, Cambodia, Vietnam, Thailand, E. Malay Peninsula, Borneo, Sumatra, Philippines
 Guioa plurinervis  – New Guinea –  Vulnerable
 Guioa pseudoamabilis  – New Guinea
 Guioa pteropoda  – New Guinea, Moluccas
 Guioa pterorhachis  – Borneo
 Guioa pubescens  – W. Malaysia, Singapore, Borneo, Sumatra, Banka, W. Java, Philippines
 Guioa reticulata  – Philippines –  Critically endangered
 Guioa rhoifolia  – Fiji, Samoa
 Guioa rigidiuscula  – New Guinea
 Guioa sarcopterifructa  – Qld, Australia
 Guioa scalariformis  – New Guinea –  Vulnerable
 Guioa semiglauca , Guioa – Qld & NSW, Australia
 Guioa subsericea  – New Guinea
 Guioa sufusana  – New Guinea
 Guioa truncata  – Philippines –  Endangered
 Guioa unguiculata  – New Guinea –  Vulnerable
 Guioa venusta  – W. New Guinea –  Vulnerable
 Guioa villosa  – New Caledonia endemic
 Guioa waigeoensis  – W. New Guinea –  Vulnerable

Formerly included here
 Guioa dasyantha    ⇒  Cnesmocarpon dasyantha''  – New Guinea, Australia

References

External links

 
Sapindaceae genera
Sapindales of Australia
Flora of Fiji
Flora of Indo-China
Flora of Malesia
Flora of New Caledonia
Flora of New Guinea
Flora of New South Wales
Flora of Queensland
Flora of Samoa
Flora of Tonga
Taxa named by Antonio José Cavanilles